Drives is an album by American organist Lonnie Smith recorded in 1970 and released on the Blue Note label.

Reception
The Allmusic review by Ron Wynn awarded the album 4 stars and stated "Lonnie Smith had the raw skills, imagination, and versatility to play burning originals, bluesy covers of R&B and pop, or skillful adaptations of conventional jazz pieces and show tunes. Why he never established himself as a consistent performer remains a mystery, but this 1970 reissue shows why he excited so many people during his rise".

Track listing
All compositions by Lonnie Smith except as indicated
 "Twenty-Five Miles" - 5:36
 "Spinning Wheel" (David Clayton-Thomas) - 7:30
 "Seven Steps to Heaven" (Miles Davis, Victor Feldman) - 5:43
 "Psychedelic Pi" - 6:30
 "Who's Afraid of Virginia Woolf?" (Don Kirkpatrick, Keith Knox) - 10:46
Recorded at Rudy Van Gelder Studio, Englewood Cliffs, New Jersey on January 2, 1970

Personnel
Lonnie Smith - organ
Dave Hubbard - tenor saxophone
Ronnie Cuber - baritone saxophone
Larry McGee - guitar
Joe Dukes - drums

Uses in other media
Alternative hip-hop group A Tribe Called Quest sampled the drum break to Smith's cover of "Spinning Wheel" in their 1990 song "Can I Kick It?", off their album People's Instinctive Travels and the Paths of Rhythm.

References

Blue Note Records albums
Lonnie Smith (organist) albums
1970 albums
Albums recorded at Van Gelder Studio
Albums produced by Francis Wolff